The Matterhorn Gotthard Bahn ABDeh 4/10, also known as Komet, is a three member class of metre gauge electric trains operated by the Matterhorn Gotthard Bahn (MGB), in the Canton of Valais, Switzerland.

The class is so named under the Swiss locomotive and railcar classification system. According to that system, ABDeh 4/10 denotes an electric railcar with first class, second class and baggage compartments, and a total of ten axles, four of which are drive axles fitted with cogwheels for rack rail operation.

Technical details
The ABDeh 4/10 class is part of the Stadler GTW family of articulated railcars.  It has an aluminium frame, semi panoramic low floor bodies, and air suspension.  The first class compartment has 47 seats, and there are 141 second class seats.

Each of the powered bogies fitted to the class is equipped with two traction motors, and with Abt rack system pinion wheels.

All three members of the class can be marshalled as part of a longer train comprising up to three similar trains, including ABDeh 4/8 class trains.

Service history
The class is used for regional train services on the Brig–Visp–Zermatt line.

See also 

 Gornergratbahn
 History of rail transport in Switzerland
 Rail transport in Switzerland

References

External links
 Matterhorn Gotthard Bahn
 Stadler Rail

This article is based upon a translation of the Dutch-language version as at December 2011.

Stadler Rail multiple units
Multiple units of Switzerland
Matterhorn Gotthard Bahn multiple units